The grey-hooded white-eye (Heleia pinaiae), also known as the grey-hooded ibon, is a species of bird in the family Zosteropidae. It is endemic to Seram Island. Its natural habitat is subtropical or tropical moist montane forest.

References

grey-hooded white-eye
Birds of Seram
grey-hooded white-eye
Taxonomy articles created by Polbot